Eliot Burying Ground (or ""Eustis Street Burying Ground" or "First Burying Ground in Roxbury") is a historic seventeenth-century graveyard at Eustis and Washington Streets in the Roxbury neighborhood of Boston, Massachusetts.

Founded in 1630, the cemetery is the oldest in Roxbury (which was annexed to Boston in 1868).  It was added to the National Register of Historic Places in 1974. The graveyard is one of several historic properties within the Eustis Street Architectural Conservation District of the Boston Landmarks Commission. Many well-known historical figures of colonial Massachusetts are buried at Eliot Burying Ground, including John Eliot, and members of the Dudley family, including Governors Thomas and Joseph Dudley, and Chief Justice Paul Dudley.

See also
 List of cemeteries in Boston, Massachusetts
 National Register of Historic Places listings in southern Boston, Massachusetts

References

External links

 

Cemeteries in Roxbury, Boston
Cemeteries on the National Register of Historic Places in Massachusetts
Roxbury, Boston
National Register of Historic Places in Boston